The 2016 Netball Quad Series was the inaugural Netball Quad Series of test matches, contested by four of the five highest ranked nations in netball. Australia were the winners of the series.

Teams

Matches

Round 1

Round 2

Round 3

Standings
<noinclude>

References

2016
2016 in netball
2016 in Australian netball
2016 in New Zealand netball
2016 in English netball
2016 in South African women's sport
International netball competitions hosted by Australia
International netball competitions hosted by New Zealand
August 2016 sports events in New Zealand
September 2016 sports events in New Zealand